Gosses Bluff (or Gosse's Bluff) is thought to be the eroded remnant of an impact crater. It was named by Ernest Giles in 1872 after Australian explorer William Gosse's brother Henry, who was a member of William's expedition.

Formation 

The original crater is thought to have been formed by the impact of an asteroid or comet approximately 142.5 ± 0.8 million years ago, in the earliest Cretaceous, very close to the Jurassic - Cretaceous boundary. The impact origin of this topographic feature was first proposed in the 1960s, the strongest evidence coming from the abundance of shatter cones. In the past the crater has been the target of petroleum exploration, and two abandoned exploration wells lie near its centre.

Cultural significance 
The site is known as Tnorala to the  Aboriginal people of the Western Arrernte language group, and is a sacred place. It is now located in the Tnorala Conservation Reserve.  A Western Arrernte story attributes its origins to a cosmic impact: in the Dreamtime, a group of celestial women were dancing as stars in the Milky Way. One of the women grew tired and placed her baby in a wooden basket, or turna (also known as a coolamon). As the women continued dancing, the basket fell and plunged into the earth. The baby fell to the earth and forced the rocks upward, forming the circular mountain range. The baby's parents, the evening and morning star, continue to search for their baby to this day.  The turna can be seen in the sky as the constellation Corona Australis.

See also 
 List of impact craters in Australia

References

External links 

 Tnorala (Gosse Bluff) Conservation Reserve 
 Nice photo of Gosse Bluff ©Yann Arthus-Bertrand 'Earth from above with Fujifilm and UNESCO'

Impact craters of the Northern Territory
Cretaceous impact craters
Early Cretaceous Australia